Misa (minor planet designation: 569 Misa) is a minor planet orbiting the Sun.

Between 1998 and 2021, 569 Misa has been observed to occult five stars.

References

External links 
 
 

Misa asteroids
Misa
Misa
C-type asteroids (Tholen)
Cg-type asteroids (SMASS)
19050727